"Le Baptême" is a short story by the French author Guy de Maupassant. The story was published in 1885.

History
It was first published in the newspaper Gil Blas on 13 January 1885, before being reprised in the Monsieur Parent collection.

This text should not be confused with a short story of the same name which was published in 1884. This story begins with the following words:

Synopsis
The story is about an old navy doctor who lives in a country house near Pont-l'Abbé. His gardener, Kérandec, has asked the doctor to be the godfather to his son. On 2 January, they set off to the church.

Publications
 Gil Blas, 1885
 Monsieur Parent - collection published in 1885 by the editor Paul Ollendorff
 Maupassant, contes et nouvelles, volume II, text established and annotated by Louis Forestier, Bibliothèque de la Pléiade, Éditions Gallimard, 1979

References

Short stories by Guy de Maupassant
1885 short stories
Works originally published in Gil Blas (periodical)